Jujubinus fulgor is a species of sea snail, a marine gastropod mollusk in the family Trochidae, the top snails.

Description
The height of the shell attains 5 mm.

Distribution
This species occurs in the Atlantic Ocean off Angola.

References

External links
 To Encyclopedia of Life

fulgor
Endemic fauna of Angola
Gastropods described in 1991
Molluscs of Angola
Molluscs of the Atlantic Ocean